The Gap Band  is the major label debut album by The Gap Band, released in 1979 on Mercury Records. It is the group's second self-titled album, and their third album overall. It reached number ten on the Billboard Top Soul Albums chart.

Track listing

Charts

Singles

References

External links
 
 The Gap Band (1979) at Discogs

1979 albums
The Gap Band albums
Mercury Records albums
Albums recorded at Total Experience Recording Studios